"There You Have It" is a song written by Steve Bogard and Rick Giles, and recorded by American country music band  Blackhawk. It was released in August 1998 as the lead-off single to their fourth album The Sky's the Limit. It peaked at number 4 on the United States Billboard Hot Country Singles & Tracks chart, and number 10 on the Canadian RPM' Country Tracks chart. It was also the band's biggest pop crossover hit, narrowly missing the top 40 and reaching 41 on the Billboard Hot 100, its only entry on that chart.

Music video
The music video was directed by Michael Oblowitz and premiered in September 1998. It was filmed in Livingston, Montana.

Chart performance
"There You Have It" debuted at number 56 on the U.S. Billboard Hot Country Singles & Tracks for the week of August 29, 1998.

Year-end charts

References

1998 songs
Blackhawk (band) songs
1998 singles
Arista Nashville singles
Song recordings produced by Mark Bright (record producer)
Songs written by Steve Bogard
Songs written by Rick Giles